Virgin Mary was a Jewish woman identified in the New Testament and in the Quran as the mother of Jesus through divine intervention

Virgin Mary may also refer to:

 Virgin Mary (cocktail)
 Virgin Mary (El Greco, Madrid), a 1597 painting in the Museo del Prado, Madrid, Spain
 Virgin Mary (El Greco, Strasbourg), a c. 1594–1604 painting in the Musée des Beaux-Arts, Strasbourg, France
 "Virgin Mary" (song), a 1975 song by Donna Summer
 The Virgin Mary (book), a 1950 book by Giovanni Miegge

See also
 Mary ever virgin (disambiguation)
 Catholic Mariology
 Anglican Marian theology
 Blessed Virgin Mary (Roman Catholic)
 Ecumenical views of Mary
 Islamic view of Virgin Mary
 Lutheran Marian theology
 Protestant views on Mary
 The Holy Virgin Mary, a 1996 painting by Chris Ofilli